Barzan is a village located on the eastern shores of the Great Zab in Erbil Governorate in Kurdistan Region, Iraq.

History 
The village was formerly the territory of Zebari tribe and was part of Bahdinan under the name Baziran. In the 19th century, the village was the residence of a Naqshbandi Sheikh and his followers, now known as the Barzani tribe.

In 1914, Barzan was the site of a Russian-supported Kurdish uprising against the Ottoman Empire, which was fought concurrently with the Bitlis uprising.

The tribe was nominally autonomous from the Ottoman Empire until 1915 when the Ottomans stormed the village and hanged the local sheikh. In the early 20th century, the village had a conflict with the neighboring Bradost tribe which necessitated intervention from Iraqi authorities.

In 1943, local Mustafa Barzani revolted and quickly gathered support against Iraq; this would develop into the 1943 Barzani revolt.

Climate
Barzan has a hot-summer Mediterranean climate (Csa) with hot, dry summers and cool, rainy winters. It is one of the rainiest cities in Iraq. Winter nights average below freezing most of the time, providing frost in the city. Snow occasionally occurs.
<div style="width:75%">

References

Kurdish settlements in Erbil Governorate
Populated places in Erbil Governorate